Hans Bietenhard (born May 31, 1916, in Olten – † September 5, 2008 in Steffisburg) was a Swiss Protestant Reformed pastor, theologian and professor emeritus of New Testament at the University of Bern.

Life and work 

Hans Bietenhard was a son of Rudolf Bietenhard (Bernese civil servant) and his wife Rosa Müller, and he grew up in Bern, where he also attended school. From 1945 to 1969 he worked as a Protestant Reformed pastor in Sonnenfeld-Schwäbis, which belongs to Steffisburg.

Education 

He studied Protestant theology in Bern, Basel, Zurich and Paris. He received his ThD at the University of Basel in 1945 and his habilitation at the University of Bern in 1948. In 1946 he married the teacher Ruth Bietenhard, née Lehmann, with whom he had six children. She also supported him in his parish ministry, especially in building up the Sonnenfeld-Schwäbis parish. Together they became honorary citizens of Steffisburg in 1994.

Teaching 

At the University of Bern he taught New Testament as well as History and Theology of Late Judaism from 1948. From 1962 he was employed as a part-time, and from 1969 to 1986 as a full-time extraordinarius of the National Fund at the Faculty of Protestant Theology.

Field of work 

Bietenhard was considered an expert on intertestamental and late Judaism in connection with the New Testament. He translated and commented on Jewish writings such as the Sota, Midrash Tanhuma B and Sifre Deuteronomy. With his wife Ruth Bietenhard, he created the translation of the New Testament into the Bernese German dialect from 1980 to 1984. From 1990 to 1994 they translated parts of the Old Testament, in which their eldest son and Hebraist Benedikt Bietenhard also assisted.

Bibliography

Books

Articles

References

Sources 

}

20th-century Calvinist and Reformed theologians
Swiss Calvinist and Reformed theologians
1916 births
2008 deaths